There are two major botanic gardens in Brisbane, Australia:
The City Botanic Gardens, located at Gardens Point in the CBD, founded in 1855
The Brisbane Botanic Gardens, Mount Coot-tha, located at the foot of Mount Coot-tha in Toowong, established in 1970